The first election to the Cardiganshre County Council was held in January 1889.  It was followed by the 1892 election. The county was divided into numerous single member wards with two councillors elected to represent Cardigan, Lampeter, New Quay and Llandysul, and four to represent the town of Aberystwyth.  37 Liberals, 10 Conservatives and 1 Unionist were returned.

Overview of the Result

1889 was one of those landmark years in the history of Welsh Liberalism, a coming of age symbolized by the triumph across Wales of Liberal candidates in the inaugural county council elections. Nowhere was this more striking than in Cardiganshire, where a little over twenty years previously the evictions controversy had been at its most apparent. Welsh historiography has, likewise, emphasised the contests in Cardiganshire, citing particular contests (such as those noted below), as symbolic of what occurred throughout Wales. If 1868 saw the cracking of the ice, wrote one historian, 1889 was the year of the flood. Only three major landowners were returned, namely Lord Lisburne, Herbert Davies-Evans (the Lord Lieutenant of the County) and J.C. Harford of Falcondale.

Unopposed Returns

There were only nine unopposed returns, all of whom were Liberals with the exception of Lord Lisburne in Strata Florida.

Contested Elections

There were a large number of contested elections and the majorities were small in most instances. In most cases there were contests between Liberal and Conservative candidates. In some wards, a form of 'primary' election took place to decide upon who should run as the Liberal candidate, although in others Liberal candidates fought each other. There were fewer instances where two Conservatives contested a seat. While many wards were hotly contested and the majorities small, in single figures in some instances, the Liberals could be considered to have scored a landslide victory. Some of the victories have been regarded as an illustration of the social changes that had taken place in the county. At Devil's Bridge, T.J. Waddingham of Hafod was defeated by the local postmaster; in Bow Street, a coal merchant (and grandfather of Elystan Morgan, later the only Labour MP to represent the county) defeated Henry Bonsall of Clarach; while in Troedyraur, Sir Marteine Lloyd, a former Conservative parliamentary candidate was defeated by a local farmer.

The local Conservative-inclined newspapers, notably the Aberystwyth Observer emphasised that local authorities were intended to be non-political and that ‘the best men’ should be elected. A few Conservative candidates, who were usually landlords, scored personal victories against the tide. Most notably the Lord Lieutenant, H. Davies-Evans won by 27 votes in Llanwenog and in neighbouring Lampeter, J.C. Harford of Falcondale had a majority of 14 over the Liberal candidate, local doctor Abel Evans. In Llanfarian two Conservatives faced each other, with Morris Davies holding off the future Liberal MP for the county, Vaughan Davies of Tanybwlch.

The contest at Aberystwyth, which led to the return of four Liberal candidates, was considered to be somewhat quiet compared with municipal contests.  In Cardigan, nominally the county town, a closely fought contest led to the return of the Conservative candidate, Picton Evans and one of the two Liberals, the former Liberal Unionist Levi James.

In some wards, such as Aberaeron and Borth, there was more excitement, with bonfires being lit to celebrate the return of the successful candidates.

Summary of Results

This section summarises the detailed results which are noted in the following sections. This was the inaugural county election and therefore no comparison can be made with the previous elections. In some cases there is an ambiguity in the sources over the party affiliations and this is explained below where relevant.

This table summarises the result of the elections in all wards. 48 councillors were elected.

|}

This table summarises the position following the election of aldermen. Eight were elected from among the elected members and eight from outside the council. This brought the total number of councillors and aldermen to 56.

|}

This table summarises the position following the by-elections for the seats vacated following the election of aldermen. Technically these were new seats, taking the total number of councillors to 64 However, the Liberals defended six seats and the Conservatives two. The Conservatives won the Tregaron seat which was won by a Liberal at the initial election but lost Llanfair Clydogau

|}

Results

Aberaeron
John Morgan Howell, an ironmonger and already a prominent figure in the public life of the county, and destined to remain so for many years, was returned with a decisive majority over John Griffiths, Nantgwynfynydd, a farmer. It was reported that, following the declaration of the result, the children of Aberarth British School were marched to the town and, in front of Howell's residence and that of the successful candidate at Aberarth (see below) instructed to give each a hearty cheer, which they did. After dark blue balls were sent off and bonfires were lit.

Aberarth
John Hugh Jones, an Aberaeron draper, defeated T.H. Maddy of Dolaeron, a barrister.

Aberbanc

Aberystwyth (four seats)
The result in Aberystwyth, after a lively contest, led to the return of the four Liberal candidates. C.M. Williams ( a draper), John James (another tradesman) and George Green (owner of the local foundry) were long-standing members of the Aberystwyth Town Council, the first two being aldermen. The fourth candidate, Thomas Levi, was a well-known figure in cultural and religious circles. John Morgan, who finished bottom of the poll, was the owner of the Aberystwyth Observer.

Blaenporth
Thomas Thomas, a farmer, of Plas, Aberporth, defeated Alexander Jenkins of Penrallt, Aberporth.

Borth
The return of the local Calvinistic Methodist minister was greeted with considerable enthusiasm. Flags were displayed and, after nightfall, bonfires lighted, fireworks discharged, houses illuminated, and hundreds of people paraded the streets up to a late hour. James and some of his supporters were drawn in an open carriage through the village and, addressing the assembly said that the day was rapidly approach- ing when laws would be made by the people for the people.

Bow Street

Cardigan Borough (two seats)
The contest had been noted for claims by the Conservatives that it should not be based on politics. On the declaration of the result and the return of Picton Evans at the head of the poll the bells of the parish church were rung, the traditional pattern for celebrating a Conservative victory in the town. Levi James, returned in second place had briefly become a Liberal Unionist after supporting David Davies at the 1886 General Election, but had subsequently returned to the Liberal fold.

Cilcennin

Two Liberal candidates contested the seat and this draw criticism in the columns of Baner ac Amserau Cymru.

Cwmrheidol

Devil's Bridge

Goginan

Lampeter Borough
John Charles Harford of Falcondale defeated Abel Evans, a surgeon of Taliesin House.

Llanarth

Llanbadarn Fawr

Llanddewi Brefi

Llandygwydd
Morgan Jones of Penylan, Llandygwydd, defeated David Lloyd, a surgeon, of Adpar, Newcastle Emlyn.

Llandyssul (two seats)

Llansysiliogogo

Llanfair Clydogau

Llanfarian

Llanfihangel y Creuddyn

Llanfihangel Ystrad

Llangoedmor

Llangeitho

Llangrannog

Llanilar

Llanrhystyd

Llanllwchaiarn and New Quay (two seats)

Llansantffraed
In a closely fought contest, the Conservative candidate won by a narrow margin over retired mariner, Daniel Jones. Surgeon Jenkin Lewis polled only 27 votes but would be more successful in future contests.

Llanwnen

Llanwenog
The Lord Lieutenant of the County defeated a Unitarian minister, reflecting past conflicts over religious issues.

Lledrod

Nantcwnlle

Penbryn
David Griffiths of Penylan Fawr defeated Simon Davies of Aberarthen. Both candidates were farmers.

Strata Florida

Taliesin

Talybont

Trefeurig

Tregaron

Troedyraur

Ysbyty Ystwyth

Election of Aldermen

In addition to the 48 councillors the council consisted of 16 county aldermen. Aldermen were elected by the council, and served a six-year term. Following the election of the initial sixteen aldermen, half of the aldermanic bench would be  elected every three years following the triennial council election. After the initial elections, there were sixteen Aldermanic vacancies and the following Alderman were appointed by the newly elected council:

Elected for six years
C.M. Williams, Liberal (elected councillor at Aberystwyth)
David Jenkins, Maesteg, Glandovey, Liberal (from outside the Council)
Roderick Lloyd, Liberal (elected councillor at Tregaron)
Levi James, Liberal (elected councillor at Cardigan)
William Davies, Liberal (elected councillor at New Quay)
J.T. Morgan, Liberal (elected councillor at Talybont)
David Lloyd, Liberal (defeated candidate at Llandygwydd)
David Davies, Maengwyn, Llanfair Orllwyn, Liberal (from outside the Council)

Elected for three years
Earl Of Lisburne, Conservative (elected councillor at Strata Florida)
Rev Llewellyn Edwards, Liberal (defeated candidate at Llanbadarn Fawr)
Jenkin Jenkins (Aeronian), Liberal(elected councillor at Nantcwnlle)
Daniel Jones, Liberal (defeated candidate at Llansantffraed)
Rev John Davies, Liberal (defeated candidate at Llanwnen)
William Jones, Conservative (elected councillor at Llanfair Clydogau)
Major Price Lewes, Conservative (defeated candidate at Cilcennin)
Jenkin Jenkins, Blaenplwyf, Liberal (defeated candidate at Ystrad Aeron)

The Liberals consented to their opponents receiving three of the sixteen aldermanic seats, roughly in proportion to their representation on the Council. Of the three Conservatives, Lord Lisburne and William Jones had been elected but Major Price Lewes of Tyglyn Aeron was bottom of the poll at Cilcennin, behind two Liberals. It was suggested that some Liberals had favoured the Lord Lieutenant, Herbert Davies-Evans and Charles Lloyd of Waunifor, defeated at Llandysul, but said to be a good financier, in place of Jones and Lewes, but had been over-ruled.

A number of elected Liberals councillors became aldermen, including Levi James of cardigan, a member of Cardigan Town Council for over twenty years; J.T. Morgan of Talybont; William Davies, Cross Inn, New Quay;

However the decision to choose eight of the new aldermen from outside of the Council soon tarnished the Liberal triumph. There had already been soundings in the local press in opposition to the move. ‘We profoundly regret the decision’ said a Cambrian News editorial, ‘to select outsiders as aldermen wherever that decision has been reached, and believe that a blow has been struck at the new bodies from which they will never recover until that decision is reversed.’   Particular objection was made to the election of aldermen of four candidates defeated at the polls. There were also two Liberal aldermen who did not even seek election.

Aldermanic Vacancies 1889-1895
Roderick Lloyd was appointed county surveyor and resigned his aldermanic seat. In May 1892, Rev John Owen was appointed to succeed him.

Therefore, the following appointment was made for the remaining three years in May 1892.

Rev John Owen, Liberal (elected councillor for Lledrod)

By-elections

Eight by-elections were caused by the election of aldermen. In several cases local meetings were held to select a Liberal candidate and avoid a contest. At Talybont, for example, a test election was contested under the supervision of, amongst other, Alderman J.T. Morgan of Maesnewydd and William Morgan of neighbouring Bow Street. The Revd. John Davies defeated Richard Jones by 109 votes to 99 and Jones enthusiastically signed the successful candidate’s nomination papers.  Two Liberal candidates unsuccessful at the first election, namely Rev John Williams in Cardigan and John Watkin Davies at Llanfair Clydogau, were elected unopposed.

The only contested elections were at Strata Florida, where a hotly contested poll led to the return of the rector of Ystrad Meurig for the seat vacates by the Earl of Lisburne and in neighbouring Tregaron, where the Conservatives captured the seat.

Aberystwyth by-election
Following the election of C.M. Williams as an alderman. D.C. Roberts, a member of a prominent Liberal family was returned unopposed.

Cardigan Borough by-election
Following the election of Levi James as an alderman, the Rev John Williams, defeated at the initial election was returned unopposed.

Llanfair Clydogau by-election
Following the election of William Jones, a Conservative, as an alderman, John Watkin Davies, the defeated Liberal candidate at the initial election was returned unopposed.

Llanllwchaiarn and New Quay by-election

Following the election of William Davies as an alderman, a test election took place at which draper John Owen Davies defeated farmer Joshua Jones of Nantypele. Davies was returned unopposed as a result.

Nantcwnlle by-election

Strata Florida by-election

Talybont by-election
Following the election of J.T. Morgan as an alderman. a test election was held between the Rev John Davies and Richard Jones, grocer. Davies was successful and was returned unopposed, with his opponent signing his nomination papers.

Tregaron by-election

References

Bibliography
 
 

1889
1889 Welsh local elections
19th century in Ceredigion